No. 2 Security Forces Squadron (2 SECFOR) is an Australian military unit whose primary role is to protect and defend airfields, buildings, equipment, and personnel.

Crest
The squadron's crest is a crossed rifle and sword surmounted by a wedge-tailed eagle in flight. The crossed rifle and sword is symbolic of the ground defence specialisation and represents both the offensive and defensive nature of ground defence within the Air Force and its inherent need to provide close-in and far-reaching security to counter hostile ground forces.

History

The unit was formed on 7 April 1945 in Morotai. It was originally designated as "2 Aerodrome Defence Squadron" (2ADS). The unit saw action during World War II  in Morotai, Labuan, Brunei, Borneo, Balikpapan and the Philippines. After the end of the war, on 29 October 1945 the squadron was disbanded.

The ADG was reformed in early 1966 as the "Aerodrome Defence Guard" (ADG) to meet the need to protect assets in the South East Asia area during the Vietnam War. By 1968 two hundred Air Defence Guard personnel were in service across South East Asia, alongside US forces.

The unit was reformed as No. 2 Airfield Defence Squadron  at RAAF Base Richmond on 17 March 1983, and in 1989 it relocated to RAAF Base Amberley, where it is currently based.

On 4 July 2013, the RAAF's security capability was reorganised. Subsequently, 2AFDS was renamed No. 2 Security Forces Squadron.

Operations
 World War II
 Thailand
 Vietnam War
 Kuwait
 East Timor
 Solomon Islands
 War in Afghanistan
 Iraq War

Structure
Headquarters Flight
Support Flight
2 Permanent Rifle Flights Based in RAAF Amberley 
2 Reserve Rifle Flights Based in RAAF Amberley 
Quick Reaction Flight, Motorised Rifle Flight equip with Bushmaster PMV's PAF Cadre Only  
Airbase Protection Flight Reserve Personal Only, Based in RAAF Amberley 
Detachment RAAF Base Darwin 1x MWD Section, 1x AFSEC Section 1x ADG Defence Section of 1 FSGT, 1 SGT & 1 CPL and Nth’ern Regional Cdr (SQNLDR) For RAAF Darwin & RAAF Tindal with the Deputy Regional Cdr a FLTLT Ground Defence Officer 
Detachment RAAF Base Tindal
Detachment RAAF Base Townsville

References

External links
 2 AFDS history
 RAAF adg website
 ADG association website

2
Military units and formations established in 1945
Recipients of the Meritorious Unit Citation
 2
Military units in Northern Territory
Military units in Queensland
1945 establishments in Australia